Tigaraksa Station (TGS) is a large class type C railway station located in Cikasungka, Solear, Tangerang Regency. The station, which is located at an altitude of +51 meters, is included in the Operation Area I Jakarta. Even though it is named Tigaraksa, this station is not located in the Tigaraksa district, but is located in the south of the Tigaraksa district itself.

Since 1 April 2013, Tigaraksa Station has served the KRL Commuterline system. But 4 years later, on 1 April 2017, Tigaraksa Station has no longer serves all local train trips operating in the Banten province.

After undergoing trials since 20 January 2021, on 1 February 2021, Tigaraksa Station was determined to be the starting point of departure for KRL Commuter Lines serving the Tanah Abang–Tigaraksa route.

Station layout 
Initially, this station only had one railroad line and was a small station. Since the operation of the double track and the extension of the KRL line network as of May 2012, the station has increased its lines to four with lines 2 and 3 being straight tracks and becoming a large station. 

This station, since 17 April 2013, has been serving Air-conditioned KRL Commuterline to Tanah Abang Station and has been crossed by a double track.

Services
The following is a list of train services at the Tigaraksa Station.
KRL Commuterline

Gallery

References

External links

Tangerang Regency
Railway stations in Banten